Wang Meng (王萌, born 21 June 1988) is a Chinese woman cricketer who represents China women's national cricket team in domestic and international cricket in Women's Twenty20 cricket.
She made her international cricket debut in 2018 when Chinese women's team toured South Korea.

A right-handed batter with right-arm medium-fast bowling style, she was also a part of China Women vs Japan Women in Women's Twenty20 International format held in September 2019 in Incheon. She played her last T20 in 2019 against HongKong Women at Incheon- September 22, 2019.

References 

1988 births
Living people
Chinese women cricketers
Asian Games competitors for China
China women Twenty20 International cricketers
Cricketers at the 2010 Asian Games
Cricketers at the 2014 Asian Games